Frank Edward Woolley (27 May 1887 – 18 October 1978) was an English professional cricketer who played for Kent County Cricket Club between 1906 and 1938 and for the England cricket team. A genuine all-rounder, Woolley was a left-handed batsman and a left-arm bowler. He was an outstanding fielder close to the wicket and is the only non wicket-keeper to have held over 1,000 catches in a first-class career, whilst his total number of runs scored is the second highest of all time and his total number of wickets taken the 27th highest.

Woolley played for England in 64 Test matches from 1909 to 1934 and is generally regarded as one of cricket's greatest all-rounders. He was a Wisden Cricketer of the Year in the 1911 edition of the almanack and was inducted into the ICC Cricket Hall of Fame in 2009.

Early life
Woolley was born at Tonbridge in Kent in 1887, the youngest of four brothers. His father, Charles Woolley, owned a bicycle workshop in the town's High Street and Woolley was born above the business. Charles combined his workshop with a dyeing business he had inherited from his father, but had trained as an engineer at a railway works in Ashford; it was here that he had met and married his wife, Louise Lewis, the daughter of the owner of the railway works.

The family business was close to the Angel Ground, home of Tonbridge Cricket Club and a ground used for a festival week annually by Kent County Cricket Club. In 1899 the ground became the base for the Tonbridge Nursery, a training centre established to train Kent's young professional cricketers. The cricketers who passed through the Nursery formed the basis of Kent's four County Championship winning sides during Woolley's early cricket career. Woolley was interested in cricket from an early age and he would play with his brothers behind his father's workshop; the brothers also watched matches on the Angel Ground from a tree which overlooked the ground. He was also a keen association footballer, good enough to play for Tonbridge and to sign for Tunbridge Wells Rangers F.C. in 1906.

His father's business, which eventually developed into a motor vehicle garage, was doing well by the time Woolley was a teenager, and Frank had the opportunity to attend the fee-paying Tonbridge School. His natural cricketing ability had, however, attracted attention. He helped out by fielding during practice matches at the Angel Ground, before being asked to join in a match to make up the numbers by Tom Pawley, Kent's manager. Woolley did not consider himself a scholar and did not take up the chance of a place at Tonbridge, instead opting to leave school aged 14. He was officially taken on as a young professional by Kent in 1903, training full-time under William McCanlis at the Nursery during the cricket season. His brother Claud was taken on at the Nursery around the same time.

Woolley impressed McCanlis and the other Nursery coaches and in 1905 he made his Kent Second XI debut against Surrey Second XI at The Oval. Nursery professionals were made available for club sides which were able to request their service, and throughout the season Woolley scored 960 runs and took 115 wickets playing for a variety of sides. He was coached and mentored by Colin Blythe, a Kent professional who lived in Tonbridge and who bowled slow left-arm spin, the same bowling style as Woolley. Blythe had been Woolley's childhood hero and he appears to have modelled his bowling action on the older man, holding his bowling arm behind his back as he approached the wicket—Woolley's biographer Ian Peebles suggested that the main difference was that Woolley's left-arm came from his hip pocket rather than from his right armpit as Blythe's had done.

Cricket career 

After a single Second XI match in May 1906, a match in which he played alongside his brother Claud, Woolley was drafted into Kent's First XI for the County Championship match against Lancashire at Old Trafford as a replacement for Blythe who had injured his hand fielding. His first-class cricket debut was marked by a third-ball duck, dropping Johnny Tyldesley, who scored 295 not out, three times and taking just one wicket in Lancashire's first innings. In Kent's second innings however, he scored 64 runs and he retained his place in the side for most of the remainder of the season, only dropping out of the First XI during Canterbury Cricket Week, a significant social occasion when amateur batsmen were more likely to make themselves available to play.

He took his first five-wicket haul in his second match against Somerset at Gravesend, before a fine all-round performance against Surrey at The Oval in his third match–eight wickets, including five wickets for 80 runs (5/80) in Surrey's second innings, and scores of 72 and 26 not out won the match for Kent and established Woolley's reputation as a young player of significant promise. A first century followed in his next match, played at the Angel Ground, and by the end of the season he had been awarded his county cap as Kent won their first County Championship title.

Writing after the end of the 1906 season, Wisden said that "Good as he already is, Woolley will no doubt... go far ahead of his first season's doings. It is quite possible he will be the best left-handed bat in England." He had played 16 matches, scored 779 runs and took 42 wickets. It was to be the only time he did not score at least 1,000 runs in a season in his career. Woolley achieved the feat 28 times, equalling WG Grace's record. He scored more than 2,000 runs 12 times and in 1928 scored 3,352; in every season other than 1919 he scored at least 1,000 runs for Kent. His total of 58,959 runs is the second highest of all time in first-class matches, beaten only by Jack Hobbs, and his 145 centuries is seventh on the all-time list.

As a bowler, Woolley was most effective before a knee injury in 1924–25. He took a total of 2,066 wickets and achieved the cricketer's double of 1,000 runs and 100 wickets in a season eight times. He took 132 five-wicket hauls and took 10 wickets in a match 28 times. His 1,018 catches as a fielder are the most taken by any non wicket-keeper.

Woolley played 64 Test matches for England between 1909 and 1934 and did not miss a Test match for the side between 1909 and 1926. He scored 3,283 Test runs at an average of 36.07 and made five Test centuries. He took 83 wickets and 64 catches for the side. He was a Wisden Cricketer of the Year in 1911 and was the first winner of the Walter Lawrence Trophy for the fastest hundred scored in England in 1934.

In total Woolley played in 978 first-class matches, including a record 764 for Kent, in a career which lasted until 1938.  He holds the Kent records for most career runs, centuries and catches and for total runs in a single season and is fifth on the county's list of all-time wicket takers. He retired aged 51, scoring 1,590 runs in his final season. He was inducted into the Federation of International Cricketers' Associations Hall of Fame in 2000 and made an inaugural member of the ICC Cricket Hall of Fame when it was established in 2009.

Style and technique
Writing for Barclay's World of Cricket, Harry Altham described Woolley as a "tall and graceful" figure who, with "a quiet air" was "unhurried in his movements". As a batsman, he had a gift for timing his shots and made full use of his long reach; he was especially strong in driving off his back foot against balls that other batsmen might consider good length deliveries. He was equally graceful as a bowler, making full use of his height to extract additional bounce from his deliveries. Altham pointed out that, although Woolley lacked the subtlety of Wilfred Rhodes, he was nevertheless a formidable bowler on any pitch whose conditions helped him. Woolley's long reach and his "large, prehensile hands" made him an excellent fielder close to the wicket. Neville Cardus described him as "the most stylish professional batsman in the country" and wrote that no other cricketer alive "had served the meadow game as happily and faithfully as Woolley",  whilst in his obituary in The Daily Telegraph, EW Swanton described him as "as graceful a batsman as ever played".

According to R. C. Robertson-Glasgow "when you wrote about him, there weren't enough words. In describing a great innings by Woolley, and few of them were not great in artistry, you had to be careful with your adjectives and stack them in little rows, like pats of butter or razor-blades. In the first over of his innings, perhaps, there had been an exquisite off-drive, followed by a perfect cut, then an effortless leg-glide. In the second over the same sort of thing happened; and your superlatives had already gone. The best thing to do was to presume that your readers knew how Frank Woolley batted and use no adjectives at all." He went on: "there was all summer in a stroke by Woolley, and he batted as it is sometimes shown in dreams." In his Wisden obituary, R. L. Arrowsmith wrote "his average rate of scoring has been exceeded only by Jessop and equalled by Trumper. His philosophy was to dominate the bowler. 'When I am batting,' he said, 'I am the attack'."

Wartime service

After the outbreak of World War I in August 1914 the English cricket season continued, although public interest declined and the social side of the game was curtailed. Woolley was married in September and did not immediately join the armed forces, instead working in his father's workshop which had been converted to manufacture munitions. His three brothers all joined the Kent Fortress Royal Engineers in 1914, and in 1915 Woolley attempted to join them but failed his medical. He was recruited by Jack Hobbs, also working in the munitions industry, to play for Keighley in the Bradford Cricket League and made a number of appearances in exhibition matches, including making a century for a Lancashire side against Yorkshire during 1916.

The same year Woolley was accepted for service by the Royal Naval Air Service. He began training in November 1916 and in March 1917 was posted to Dover, attached to a motor boat section. He was promoted to Aircraftman first class and in February 1918 posted to Felixstowe where he was the coxswain of a rescue launch. The RNAS merged with the Royal Flying Corps in April 1918 to form the Royal Air Force and Woolley transferred to the new organisation. He was posted to North Queensferry in Scotland where he worked for Admiral Sir John de Robeck. Robeck was a keen cricketer and Woolley was attached to his flagship HMS King George V.

Robeck arranged a number of cricket matches, including at the home of Lord Rosebery the former captain of Surrey. Woolley played a number of other exhibition matches during the summer of 1918, including for an England side against a Dominions XI and for sides organised by Plum Warner. He was transferred to the RAF Reserve in January 1919 before being officially discharged in 1920; during 1922 he played a single first-class match for the Royal Air Force cricket team.

Later life and family

Woolley had married Sybil Fordham, the daughter of an Ashford veterinary surgeon, in 1914. The couple had three children, a son and two daughters. Before his retirement Woolley had bought a bungalow at Hildenborough on a site large enough for him to establish a cricket school. He coached cricket at The King's School, Canterbury, but after the break out of World War II the school was evacuated to Cornwall and Woolley moved to Cliftonville where he joined the Local Defence Volunteers. His only son, Richard, died whilst serving as a merchant seaman on SS Beaverford as part of Convoy HX 84 in November 1940, and the house in Cliftonville was destroyed in a bombing raid in 1941.

During the war Woolley played in a number of exhibition matches designed to entertain the public and help boost morale. After the war, he moved to Tunbridge Wells, continuing to coach at The King's School for ten years as well as spending a summer coaching cricket at a Butlin's holiday camp during the early 1950s. He played twice for Old England sides, was elected a life member of both Kent and MCC, and served on the Kent General Committee between 1950 and 1961. Sybil died in 1962, and Woolley moved to live with one of his daughters at Longwick in Buckinghamshire.

He remained active, regularly visiting the St Lawrence Ground during Canterbury Cricket Week, and in January 1971 he flew to Australia to watch the last two Tests of the 1970–71 Ashes series. Later in the year he married an American widow, Martha Wilson Morse and set up home in the Canadian Province of Nova Scotia. He died in 1978 at their home at Chester, Nova Scotia aged 91. A memorial service was held at Canterbury Cathedral and Woolley's ashes were scattered at the St Lawrence Ground.

Notes

References

Bibliography
Birley D (1999) A Social History of English Cricket. London: Aurum Press Ltd. 
Burrowes P, Knight L, Oakes S, Barnard D, Francis P, Carlaw D, Milton H (eds) (2021) Kent County Cricket Club Annual 2021. Canterbury: Kent County Cricket Club.
Carlaw D (2020) Kent County Cricketers A to Z. Part One: 1806–1914 (revised edition). (Available online at The Association of Cricket Statisticians and Historians. Retrieved 21 December 2020.)
Croudy B (1995) Colin Blythe – Famous Cricketers Series, No.27. Nottingham: The Association of Cricket Statisticians and Historians.  (Available online. Retrieved 29 December 2018.)
Ellis C, Pennell M (2010) Trophies and Tribulations: Forty Years of Kent Cricket. London: Greenwich Publishing. 
Hart-Davis R (ed) (2010) Cardus on Cricket. London: Souvenir Press. 
Hughes SP (2010) And God Created Cricket. London: Transworld. 
Lewis P (2014) For Kent and Country. Brighton: Reveille Press. 
Milton H (1998) FE Woolley – Famous Cricketers Series, No.4, second edition. Nottingham: The Association of Cricket Statisticians and Historians.  (Available online. Retrieved 25 December 2021.)
Milton H (2020) Kent County Cricket Grounds. Woking: Pitch Publishing. 
Moore D (1988) The History of Kent County Cricket Club. London: Christopher Helm. 
Moseling M, Quarrington T (2013) A Half-Forgotten Triumph. Cheltenham: SportsBooks. 
Renshaw A (2014) Wisden on the Great War: The Lives of Cricket's Fallen 1914-1918. London: Bloomsbury.  (Available online. Retrieved 31 December 2020.)
Scoble CL (2005) Colin Blythe: Lament for a Legend. Cheltenham: SportsBooks. 
Swanton EW (2011) Woolley, Frank Edward, Oxford Dictionary of National Biography (online). Retrieved 26 December 2021. 
Swanton EW, Plumptre G, Woodcock JC (eds) (1986) Barclay's World of Cricket, 3rd edition. London: Willow Books. 
Wilde S (2013) Wisden Cricketers of the Year: A Celebration of Cricket's Greatest Players. London: John Wisden & Co.

External links

1887 births
1978 deaths
British Home Guard soldiers
Royal Naval Air Service personnel of World War I
Royal Naval Air Service personnel
Royal Air Force personnel of World War I
Royal Air Force airmen
Military personnel from Kent
England Test cricketers
English cricketers of 1890 to 1918
English cricketers of 1919 to 1945
English cricketers
Kent cricketers
London Counties cricketers
Marylebone Cricket Club cricketers
Non-international England cricketers
North v South cricketers
Over 30s v Under 30s cricketers
People from Tonbridge
Players cricketers
Players of the South cricketers
Royal Air Force cricketers
Wisden Cricketers of the Year
C. I. Thornton's XI cricketers
L. G. Robinson's XI cricketers
L. H. Tennyson's XI cricket team
Marylebone Cricket Club Australian Touring Team cricketers
Marylebone Cricket Club South African Touring Team cricketers